Ali Ahmed politician of Satkhira District of Bangladesh and former member of Parliament for the Satkhira-3 constituency in February 1996.

Career 
Ali Ahmed was elected to parliament from Satkhira-3 as a Bangladesh Nationalist Party candidate in 15 February 1996 Bangladeshi general election. He was defeated from Satkhira-3 constituency as a candidate of Bangladesh Nationalist Party in the 7th Jatiya Sangsad elections on 12 June 1996.

References 

Bangladesh Nationalist Party politicians
6th Jatiya Sangsad members
Living people
Year of birth missing (living people)
People from Satkhira District